The large tree mouse (Pogonomys loriae) is a species of rodent in the family Muridae.
It is found on the island of New Guinea (Indonesia and Papua New Guinea).

References

Pogonomys
Mammals described in 1897
Taxonomy articles created by Polbot
Taxa named by Oldfield Thomas